Henry Tam (born 24 June 1988) is a former New Zealand badminton player representing New Zealand from 2004 - 2010. He competed at the Bendigo 2004 Commonwealth Youth Games and Delhi 2010 Commonwealth Games. His most notable title was in 2008, where he won the mixed doubles title at the Oceania Championships in Nouméa, New Caledonia with Donna Haliday. In addition to his 5 international titles in the mixed doubles, his other notable achievements was a run of five consecutive New Zealand National men's doubles titles during 2010–2014.

Achievements

Oceania Championships 
Men's doubles

Mixed doubles

BWF Grand Prix 
The BWF Grand Prix had two levels, the BWF Grand Prix and Grand Prix Gold. It was a series of badminton tournaments sanctioned by the Badminton World Federation (BWF) which was held from 2007 to 2017.

Mixed doubles

  BWF Grand Prix Gold tournament
  BWF Grand Prix tournament

BWF International Challenge/Series 
Men's doubles

Mixed doubles

  BWF International Challenge tournament
  BWF International Series tournament
  BWF Future Series tournament

References

External links 
 

1988 births
Living people
New Zealand people of Hong Kong descent
New Zealand male badminton players
Badminton players at the 2010 Commonwealth Games
Commonwealth Games competitors for New Zealand